This is a list of bridges on the National Register of Historic Places in Washington, D.C.

See also
 National Register of Historic Places listings in the District of Columbia
 Architecture of Washington, D.C.

References

 
District
Bridges
Bridges